Antonio José may refer to:

People
 Antonio Díaz (karateka), full name Antonio José Díaz Fernández (born 1980), Venezuelan kata martial artist
 Antonio José Álvarez de Abreu, Spanish noble and lawyer
 Antonio José Amar y Borbón, Spanish military officer and colonial official
 Antonio José Benavides, Venezuelan general
 Antonio José Carranza, Venezuelan painter
 Antonio José Cavanilles, Spanish botanist
 Antonio José Cañas, Salvadoran military officer, diplomat and politician
 Antonio José de Sucre (1795–1830), Venezuelan independence leader, President of Peru, President of Bolivia
 Antonio José González Zumárraga, Ecuadorian cardinal
 Antonio José Herrero Uceda, Spanish painter
 Antonio José López Martínez, Spanish footballer
 Antonio José Martínez, American priest, educator and publisher
 Antonio José Martínez Palacios, Spanish composer
 Antonio José Pardo Andretta, Venezuelan alpine skier
 Antonio José Ramírez Salaverría, Venezuelan prelate
 Antonio José Sánchez Mazuecos, Spanish singer
 Antonio José Ruiz de Padrón, Spanish politician and priest
 Antonio José de Irisarri, Guatemalan statesman, journalist and politician
 Antonio José de Sucre, Venezuelan independence leader and former president of Perú and Bolivia

See also
 Antonio José de Sucre Airport, an airport in Cumaná, Venezuela
 Antonio José de Sucre Municipality, a Venezuelan municipality in the state of Barinas